Alberto Vilariño Sobrado (born 20 April 1996), commonly known as Keko, is a Spanish footballer who plays as a midfielder for SD Sarriana.

Club career
Born in A Pobra de San Xiao, Láncara, Lugo, Keko was a youth product of CD Lugo. He made his official debut for the Galicians' main squad on 16 October 2013, while still a junior, starting in a 0–1 away loss against Recreativo de Huelva for the season's Copa del Rey.

On 18 July 2014 Keko moved to Levante UD, being initially assigned to the Juvenil squad. On 1 September of the following year he rescinded his contract, and returned to Lugo seven days later.

On 27 January 2016, Keko and his Lugo teammate Dani Pedrosa were loaned to UD Somozas in Segunda División B, until June. On 30 August, their loan was renewed for a year.

On 10 August 2018, Keko terminated his contract with Lugo.

References

External links

1996 births
Living people
People from Sarria (comarca)
Sportspeople from the Province of Lugo
Spanish footballers
Footballers from Galicia (Spain)
Association football midfielders
Segunda División B players
Tercera División players
Divisiones Regionales de Fútbol players
CD Lugo players
Atlético Levante UD players
UD Somozas players
CCD Cerceda players
Spain youth international footballers